Belly is a 1998 American crime drama film written and directed by music video director Hype Williams, in his feature film directing debut. Filmed in New York City, the film stars rappers Nas and DMX in their film debut, alongside Taral Hicks, Method Man, and R&B singer T-Boz.

A sequel, Belly 2: Millionaire Boyz Club, was released in 2006.

Plot
In 1999 Queens, New York City, young street criminals Tommy "Bunds" Brown and Sincere ("Sin"), along with associates Mark and Black, murder five people during a violent nightclub robbery. After celebrating with the gang, Sincere returns home to his girlfriend Tionne and infant daughter Kenya.

The following morning, Tommy asks Sincere to help him sell a new form of heroin. Sincere, who has begun having second thoughts about his life of crime, reluctantly agrees. Tommy then visits Ox, a wealthy Jamaican drug lord, who agrees to obtain the heroin on the condition that Tommy repay him with a favor at a later date. 

In Mark's grandmother's basement, the gang convenes to discuss the nascent drug operation; one of Tommy's associates, Knowledge, will be involved in the operation. Knowledge tells his friend Tommy over the phone that Black had been talking about robbing his friend Sincere to get his larger share of the loot from the nightclub. Way too enraged, Tommy forces Black to strip naked in front of the others, wildly firing warning shots with a handgun into the floor to make somebody like him do so. 

The gang begins transporting heroin from Queens to Omaha, Nebraska, where they begin to overrun the local drug business. Big Head Rico, an Omaha dealer, informs the police of their activities. The resulting raid at their stash-house ends with Mark's death and Knowledge's arrest. Knowledge angrily realizes that Tommy will not bail him out of jail, and calls Shameek, a.k.a. Father Sha, to both infiltrate Rico's gang and kill Tommy. At a strip club, Shameek drinks shots that Rico spiked with hallucinatory powder and, under the influence, blows his own cover by telling Rico that he was sent by Knowledge to take care of Rico. Rico gets up and informs his henchmen but is gunned down by Shameek as he tries to flee. Shameek is shot by the bartender and stumbles out of the club. He shoots at and evades the police.

Tommy travels to Jamaica and repays Ox by killing Sosa, the son of a local drug lord. Back home, Tommy's girlfriend Keisha is arrested by police and later bailed out by Tionne. Tommy finds out about the raid and leaves town. Pelpa, a close friend of Sosa, finds out that Ox ordered the hit on Sosa. Pelpa sends a hit squad to kill Ox in his home. Ox kills most of the hitmen before dying at the hands of a female assassin.

Sincere prepares to leave the drug trade and move his family to Africa, planning to leave on New Year's Day 2000. Meanwhile, while laying low in Atlanta, Tommy instigates an argument between Wise and LaKid, two marijuana dealers, which ends with both men drawing their guns and LaKid shooting Wise. After being arrested over the shooting, Tommy is coerced by a shadowy organization with unclear motives into assassinating a Black Muslim leader, Rev. Saviour, during a sermon on New Year's Eve. Tionne comes home and finds herself confronted by Shameek and his henchmen, who had broken into the home in hopes of finding Sincere, but were unsuccessful. After attempting to interrogate Tionne for information on Sincere and Tommy, they leave when she pulls a gun on them. When Sincere comes home, Tionne tells him what happened and insists, as she has throughout the movie, that he get out of this dangerous life. He agrees and suggests they move to Africa. 

Tommy calls Sincere and asks him to come meet him at a diner in Harlem. They have not seen each other in a long time. Comparing notes, they acknowledge that they have both changed. Tommy has been positively influenced by the movement he has infiltrated Black Muslim and Rev. Savior and Sincere has similarly decided to change his life in a positive direction, telling Tommy of his plans focus on his family and move to Africa. They marvel at how far they have come and how their paths have changed.  

While Sincere talks to his barber outside a barbershop, Black arrives and shoots Sincere in the leg as revenge for his earlier humiliation. Sincere and his barber kill Black and his accomplice in self-defense before fleeing the scene. On New Year's Eve, a conflicted Tommy confronts Rev. Saviour before his scheduled speech and points his gun at him. Saviour convinces Tommy not to go through with his mission, even though this will put his life at risk. A tearful Tommy agrees, and the two men embrace. 

Shameek breaks into one of Tommy's homes where Keisha is living, in the hopes of finding Tommy there. He interrogates and assaults Keisha, who manages to turn the tables and get a hold of Shameek's gun, shooting him in the face. In a voiceover, Sincere says he is now in Africa with his family, reflects on recent events and is happy to start a new life.

Cast

Production
While filming Belly, the production was mired by frequent clashes between Williams and the producers, budget constraints, and cast members showing up drunk, high, or late. Much of the $3 million budget was used up on the film's opening scene, which was filmed in the former Tunnel nightclub in New York City. The film's costume designer, June Ambrose, recalled that Williams wanted the film's "shiny look" to "forecast what the hip-hop genre's gonna look like in the millennium." Williams revealed that Jay-Z was considered for the film's title role.

Release and controversy of the film
When Belly was released in the United States in November 1998, some critics condemned it for its demeaning depictions of young Black or African American men. Furthermore, the Magic Johnson Theatres, a film theater chain then owned by the former basketball player Magic Johnson, banned the film from being shown on its screens due to "negative and violent depictions of African Americans."

Reception
The film was poorly received by critics, scoring a 24% on Rotten Tomatoes from 21 reviews. Although it was generally praised for its highly stylized "noir-like" visual design and cinematography, it was criticized for what was seen as a weak plot.

The film has since developed a cult following. Clayton Purdom of The A.V. Club described Belly as a "far from a perfect film, but it radiates talent, both from Williams and the musicians he captured at their commercial and artistic peak." Khris Davenport of Complex doubled down on the film's legacy and influence, writing that Williams "blazed a trail in black cinema that some filmmakers are only just now starting to understand and build upon."

Soundtrack

See also 
 List of hood films

References

External links

1998 crime drama films
African-American films
American crime drama films
American gangster films
Artisan Entertainment films
1998 independent films
1998 directorial debut films
1998 films
Films about African-American organized crime
Films about drugs
Films set in 1999
Films set in 2000
Films set in New York City
Films set in Nebraska
Films set in Jamaica
Films set in the future
Films shot in New York City
Films shot in New Jersey
Films shot in Jamaica
1990s hip hop films
Hood films
American neo-noir films
Films directed by Hype Williams
Films set around New Year
1990s English-language films
1990s American films